Sidney "Sonny" Hertzberg (July 29, 1922 – July 25, 2005) was an American professional basketball player.

Early life
Hertzberg was born in Brooklyn, New York, grew up in Crown Heights, and was Jewish. Hertzberg played at Samuel J. Tilden High School and City College of New York, where he was a teammate of longtime Knicks coach Red Holzman.

Professional career
Hertzberg began his professional career in 1946, signing with his home team New York Knicks. He played with the team in the inaugural Basketball Association of America season in 1946–47. He played five games with the team in the 1947–48 before being released. Hertzberg signed with the Washington Capitols, and played for two seasons with the team under future Hall of Fame coach Red Auerbach. On September 28, 1949, Hertzberg was traded to the Boston Celtics for Chick Halbert. Hertzberg was reunited with former Washington coach Auerbach in his second season with Boston in 1950–51. Auerbach and rookie point guard Bob Cousy referred to Hertzberg as "the second coach on the floor", and he was respected for his playmaking and court savviness.

After playing five seasons of professional basketball, Hertzberg served as a scout and broadcasting commentator for the Knicks.

He is a member of the New York City Basketball Hall of Fame, the Old-Timers Basketball Hall of Fame, the City College Hall of Fame, and the National Jewish Sports Hall of Fame.

Later life and death
Hertzberg went on to become a managing director of Bear Stearns, an investment banking and brokerage firm.

Hertzberg died of heart failure on July 25, 2005 at his home in Woodmere, New York.

BAA/NBA career statistics

Regular season

Playoffs

See also
List of select Jewish basketball players

References

External links

 Knicks.com – Remembering Sonny
 The First Basket – Documentary Film

1922 births
2005 deaths
American men's basketball players
Bear Stearns people
Boston Celtics players
CCNY Beavers men's basketball players
Jewish American sportspeople
Jewish men's basketball players
New York Knicks announcers
New York Knicks players
Sportspeople from Brooklyn
Basketball players from New York City
Washington Capitols players
Samuel J. Tilden High School alumni
Guards (basketball)
20th-century American Jews
21st-century American Jews